In mathematics, a principal branch is a function which selects one branch ("slice") of a multi-valued function.  Most often, this applies to functions defined on the complex plane.

Examples

Trigonometric inverses 

Principal branches are used in the definition of many inverse trigonometric functions, such as the selection either to define that

or that
.

Exponentiation to fractional powers 

For example, take the relation , where  is any positive real number.

In this instance, the positive square root function is taken as the principal branch of the multi-valued relation .

Complex logarithms 

One way to view a principal branch is to look specifically at the exponential function, and the logarithm, as it is defined in complex analysis.

The exponential function is single-valued, where  is defined as:

where .

However, the periodic nature of the trigonometric functions involved makes it clear that the logarithm is not so uniquely determined.  One way to see this is to look at the following:

and

where  is any integer and  continues the values of the -function from their principal value range , corresponding to  into the principal value range of the -function , covering all four quadrants in the complex plane.

Any number  defined by such criteria has the property that .

In this manner log function is a multi-valued function (often referred to as a "multifunction" in the context of complex analysis). These are the chosen principal values.

This is the principal branch of the log function.  Often it is defined using a capital letter, .

See also
Branch point
 Branch cut
Complex logarithm
Riemann surface

External links
 
 Branches of Complex Functions Module by John H. Mathews

Complex analysis